Asayama is a Japanese surname. Notable people with the surname include:

, Japanese basketball player and coach
, Japanese baseball player

See also
Asayama Ichiden-ryū, a Japanese martial art

Japanese-language surnames